Pandulf of Anagni (died 1256) was an Italian cleric and military commander who became the bishop of Anagni in 1237. He came from a prominent family closely connected to a series of popes. In papal service, he led an army into the Kingdom of Sicily during the War of the Keys in 1229. As bishop, he commissioned the frescoes in the cathedral of Anagni.

Family and papal curia
Pandulf was a native of Anagni. He appears in Latin sources as Pandulfus de Anagnia before his election as bishop. He belonged to the family of Conti di Anagni, a branch of the counts of Segni. He was probably related to Pope Gregory IX, who was also from Anagni.

Pandulf was as a subdeacon and chaplain in the Roman curia under Gregory IX. In Gregory's biography in the Liber censuum, he is described as an "experienced" military man (experate providentie virum cum militum). The Libers modern editor, misidentified the chaplain Pandulf with Bishop Pandulf of Patti (1235–1244). Both were active in the service of Gregory IX at the same time. Unlike the future bishop of Patti, however, the chaplain is never described as a papal notary. Although he is sometimes identified with the Master Pandulf who served Honorius III, this was more likely the future bishop of Patti.

Military commander
When the pope waged war on the Emperor Frederick II in 1228–1230, Gregory appointed Pandulf as his apostolic legate over the three armies and named him rector of Marittima e Campagna. Pandulf personally took command of the southern force and invaded the Kingdom of Sicily, forcing his way across the Liri at Ceprano on 18 January 1229. He had under him two Sicilian exiles as his captains, Counts Thomas of Molise and Roger of Aquila. His army consisted mainly of infantry raised in the Papal States.

Pandulf's initial advance was highly successful. The Liber celebrates his defeat of the Justiciar Henry of Morra "with just a few infantry and God on his side". He took Monte Cassino after fierce fighting. Resuming his advance in March, he took Gaeta, laid siege to Capua, took Alife and Telese, and joined up with the papal troops of Benevento. Advancing down the Garigliano, he met stiff resistance at Suessa, where he was replaced as legate by Cardinal Pelagius of Albano for reasons unknown. Suessa fell to Pelagius in May. Sometime after his demotion, Pandulf is found among the supporters of Frederick.

Bishop
In 1237, Pandulf became the bishop of Anagni. He is first recorded as bishop elect on 8 June 1237 and was consecrated by 25 May 1238. He continued the restoration of the cathedral of Anagni that had begun with the renovation of the floor in cosmatesque style by Cosimo between 1224 and 1227. He commissioned a series of frescoes and built a new ambo, among other probably changes. He left an inscription: "Bishop Pandulf had this work made in the year of the Lord 1250" (PANDULF EPVS FIERI FECIT HOC OPUS ANO DNI MCCL). The first record of the future Pope Boniface VIII is as a canon witnessing an act of Pandulf's on 16 October 1250. Pandulf made his will on 20 February 1255. He died in Anagni in 1256.

Notes

Bibliography

External links

1256 deaths

Year of birth unknown
People from Anagni
Bishops of Anagni